Leber is an unincorporated community in Pierce County, in the U.S. state of Washington.

History
A post office called Leber was established in 1877, and remained in operation until 1909. Peter Leber, an early postmaster, gave the community his name.

References

Unincorporated communities in Pierce County, Washington
Unincorporated communities in Washington (state)